The International Commission on Irrigation and Drainage (ICID), established in 1950, is a global organization concerned with irrigation and drainage.

Events 

At the annual International Executive Council, various technical working groups organize meetings on the key focus areas as part of their Annual Meeting during the IEC. ICID organizes the triennial World Irrigation and Drainage Congress and World Irrigation Forum. Regional Conferences, Micro-irrigation Conference and Drainage Workshops are also organized to address and discuss issues of global/regional importance.

References

External links 
 International Commission on Irrigation and Drainage (ICID)
 Koride Mahesh, "Telangana irrigation structure receives heritage tag", Times of India, 9 September 2018

Organizations established in 1950
Irrigation